"Girl Out of the Ordinary" is a song recorded by Canadian country music artist Beverley Mahood. It was released in 1997 as the first single from her debut album, Girl Out of the Ordinary. It peaked at number 10 on the RPM Country Tracks chart in May 1997.

Chart performance

Year-end charts

References

1997 songs
Beverley Mahood songs
1997 debut singles